The 2019 Aurora Games was a female international multi-sport event that was held between 20 and 25 August 2019 in Albany, New York, United States of America. Planned to be a biennial event, the Times Union Center served as host venue. Albany shall also serve as host city for the 2021 and 2023 Aurora Games.

The Aurora Games, designed as a multisport women's version of the Laver Cup, has in addition featured musical performances, food tastings, sports clinics, autograph sessions and the “Conversations with Champions” series of seminars. The keynote speaker for the Aurora Games was Judge Rosemarie Aquilina, who presided over the case of the disgraced USA Gymnastics doctor Larry Nassar.

The Games

Sports
The 2019 Aurora Games programme featured seven sports. Team and individual competitions consisted of athletes from 15 countries participating as part of All-star teams known as Team Americas and Team World. Said teams were led by honorary captains Jackie Joyner-Kersee and Nadia Comăneci with the teams competing for the Babe Didrikson Zaharias Trophy. Team Americas captured the first Trophy, defeating Team World in six of the seven events.

Results

Rosters

Team Americas
THIS IS AN INCOMPLETE LIST
Honorary captain: Jackie Joyner-Kersee

Team World
THIS IS AN INCOMPLETE LIST
Honorary captain: Nadia Comăneci

Athlete Advisory Committee
The Athlete Advisory Committee is chaired by Donna de Varona.

Broadcasting
During May 2019, ESPN announced that it was to serve as the exclusive broadcast home for the inaugural Aurora Games.

References

External links
 Official site

Sports festivals in the United States
Multi-sport events in the United States
Aurora Games
Aurora Games
Aurora Games, Winter
Aurora Games
February 2019 sports events in the United States
2019 in sports in New York (state)
Events in Albany, New York